B. Sumeeth Reddy (born 26 September 1991) is an Indian badminton player who currently plays men's doubles. He was part of Indian team that clinched the gold medals in the 2016 and 2019 South Asian Games, and also claimed the men's doubles gold with Manu Attri in 2016. Reddy competed at the 2014 Asian Games, 2018 Asian Games; and at the 2016 Rio Summer Olympics in the men's doubles event.

Early life  
Sumeeth Reddy was born on September 26, 1991 (27-years old) Telangana, India. In order to make a career to badminton, Sumeeth’s father sent him to the field of badminton sports in Hyderabad at the age of 10. He made his debut in the year 2007 by taking part in Asian Junior Championship. After the championship, he continued to play for singles till he was 20 years old. He had obtained the success in the total 7 National finals and was the best junior player at that time.

Achievements

South Asian Games 
Men's doubles

BWF Grand Prix (2 titles, 3 runners-up) 
The BWF Grand Prix had two levels, the Grand Prix and Grand Prix Gold. It was a series of badminton tournaments sanctioned by the Badminton World Federation (BWF) and played between 2007 and 2017.

Men's doubles

Mixed doubles

  BWF Grand Prix Gold tournament
  BWF Grand Prix tournament

BWF International Challenge/Series (10 titles, 7 runners-up) 
Men's singles

Men's doubles

Mixed doubles

  BWF International Challenge tournament
  BWF International Series tournament

Personal life 
Sumeeth Reddy married his fellow badminton player N. Sikki Reddy in February 2019. The two had gotten engaged after the Syed Modi International in 2017. 

Sumeeth studied at All Saints High School, Hyderabad.

References

External links 
 
 

1991 births
Living people
Racket sportspeople from Telangana
People from Ranga Reddy district
Indian male badminton players
Indian national badminton champions
Badminton players at the 2016 Summer Olympics
Olympic badminton players of India
Badminton players at the 2014 Asian Games
Badminton players at the 2018 Asian Games
Asian Games competitors for India
Badminton players at the 2022 Commonwealth Games
Commonwealth Games silver medallists for India
Commonwealth Games medallists in badminton
South Asian Games gold medalists for India
South Asian Games medalists in badminton
Alumni of All Saints High School, Hyderabad
Medallists at the 2022 Commonwealth Games